Paul O'Brien is an Australian former professional rugby league footballer who played in the 1970s.

Playing career
Paul O'Brien made his début for Wakefield Trinity during March 1976, and he played his last match for Wakefield Trinity during the 1976–77 season.

References

External links
Statistics at ssralmanac.com

Living people
Place of birth missing (living people)
Rugby league centres
South Sydney Rabbitohs players
Wakefield Trinity players
Year of birth missing (living people)
Australian rugby league players
City New South Wales rugby league team players